Feigl is a surname. Notable people with the surname include:

Bedřich Feigl (1884–1965), Czech painter, graphic artist and illustrator
Erich Feigl (1931–2007), Austrian journalist, writer and film maker
Frederick Feigl (1867-1933), American publisher and military officer
Fritz Feigl (1891–1971), Austrian-Brazilian chemist
Georg Feigl (1890–1945), German mathematician
Herbert Feigl (1902–1988), Austrian philosopher
Peter Feigl (born 1951), Austrian tennis player
Polly Feigl, American biostatistician

See also
Eric Feigl-Ding (born 1983), American health scientist